Tetanostola is a genus of moths belonging to the family Tineidae. It contains only one species, Tetanostola hexagona, which is found on Madagascar.

References

Tineidae
Monotypic moth genera
Moths of Madagascar
Tineidae genera
Taxa named by Edward Meyrick